The fifth Minnesota Territorial Legislature first convened on January 4, 1854. The 9 members of the Minnesota Territorial Council and the 18 members of the Minnesota House of Representatives were elected during the General Election of October 12, 1853.

Sessions 
The territorial legislature met in a regular session from January 4, 1854 to March 4, 1854. There were no special sessions of the fifth territorial legislature.

Party summary

Council

House of Representatives

Leadership 
President of the Council
Samuel Baldwin Olmstead (D-Belle Prairie)

Speaker of the House
Nathan C. D. Taylor (D-Taylors Falls)

Members

Council

House of Representatives

Notes

References 

 Minnesota Legislators Past & Present - Session Search Results (Session 0.5, Senate)
 Minnesota Legislators Past & Present - Session Search Results (Session 0.5, House)

00.5th
1850s in Minnesota Territory